Andrew Van der Heijden, born 4 March 1984 is a Rugby union footballer. He plays as a lock. He represents Auckland in the ITM Cup and has played some matches in the Blues in Super Rugby.

Notes

External links
 itsrugby.co.uk profile

1984 births
Living people
New Zealand people of Dutch descent
New Zealand rugby union players
Auckland rugby union players
Counties Manukau rugby union players
Blues (Super Rugby) players
Chiefs (rugby union) players
Rugby union locks
Rugby union players from Auckland
Newcastle Falcons players
New Zealand expatriate rugby union players
New Zealand expatriate sportspeople in England
Expatriate rugby union players in England